Georgia's 8th Senate district is located in Valdosta, Georgia. Its current representative is C. Ellis Black.

District office holders
Tim Golden1998 – January 12,2015
C. Ellis Black January 12, 2015 - Present

References

Government of Georgia (U.S. state)
Georgia Senate districts